Swifton School District No. 33 was a school district headquartered in Swifton, Arkansas. It had a single school, the Swifton School.

Circa 2000 it had 300 students.

On July 1, 2004, the Swifton School District was merged into the Jackson County School District.

References

Further reading
  (Download) - Includes boundaries of the Swifton School District

External links
 
 Swifton School District No. 33  Jackson County, Arkansas  General Purpose Financial Statements and Other Reports June 30, 2001 
 Swifton School District No. 33  Jackson County, Arkansas  General Purpose Financial Statements  and Other Reports June 30, 2002 

Defunct school districts in Arkansas
Education in Jackson County, Arkansas
2004 disestablishments in Arkansas
School districts disestablished in 2004